Mordellistena aemula is a species of beetle in the genus Mordellistena of the family Mordellidae. It was discovered in 1859.

References

aemula
Beetles described in 1859